Arahiwi is a rural area of New Zealand approximately 6 km west of Mamaku and 25 km from Rotorua. The Rotorua Branch is a disused railway line that ran through Arahiwi to connect Putāruru and Rotorua. It closed in 2001. Arahiwi Station opened in 1863 and closed in 1960.

Demographics

Arahiwi had a population of 156 at the 2018 New Zealand census, a decrease of 21 people (−11.9%) since the 2013 census, and an increase of 6 people (4.0%) since the 2006 census. There were 54 households, comprising 81 males and 75 females, giving a sex ratio of 1.08 males per female. The median age was 31.1 years (compared with 37.4 years nationally), with 39 people (25.0%) aged under 15 years, 33 (21.2%) aged 15 to 29, 72 (46.2%) aged 30 to 64, and 9 (5.8%) aged 65 or older.

Ethnicities were 82.7% European/Pākehā, 25.0% Māori, 3.8% Pacific peoples, and 3.8% Asian. People may identify with more than one ethnicity.

The percentage of people born overseas was 15.4, compared with 27.1% nationally.

Although some people chose not to answer the census's question about religious affiliation, 59.6% had no religion, 28.8% were Christian, 1.9% had Māori religious beliefs and 1.9% had other religions.

Of those at least 15 years old, 6 (5.1%) people had a bachelor's or higher degree, and 18 (15.4%) people had no formal qualifications. The median income was $33,900, compared with $31,800 nationally. 15 people (12.8%) earned over $70,000 compared to 17.2% nationally. The employment status of those at least 15 was that 66 (56.4%) people were employed full-time, 24 (20.5%) were part-time, and 3 (2.6%) were unemployed.

References

Rotorua Lakes District
Populated places in Waikato